Stefano Eranio (born 29 December 1966) is an Italian former professional footballer who played as a midfielder. Throughout his career, Eranio played mainly as a right winger; he is mostly remembered for having played for Italian clubs A.C. Milan, and Genoa, as well as English side Derby County, and he also represented Italy 20 times between 1990 and 1997 at international level. His main attributes were his technique, pace, stamina, and his ability to make attacking runs. Although he was primarily an offensive or wide midfielder, he was also competent defensively, and he was occasionally deployed as a full-back. He was voted one of Derby County's 11 greatest ever footballers.

Club career

Genoa and Milan

Eranio started his professional football career with Genoa in August 1984. His first five seasons at Genoa were in Serie B, until in 1989, the club were promoted to Serie A. In total, Eranio played for the club for eight seasons, before moving to AC Milan in August 1992. At Milan he won three league titles (1993, 1994 and 1996), three Italian Super Cups (1992, 1993 and 1994) and he also played in two Champions League finals. The first was in 1992–93, when Milan lost 1–0 to Olympique de Marseille, and the second was in 1994–95 when his club lost 1–0 to Ajax Amsterdam. Although he was part of the team's successful Champions League campaign during the 1993–94 season, but he did not play in the final due to injury. He also added the European Super Cup to his trophy collection in 1994.

Derby County and Pro Sesto
In May 1997 he moved on a free transfer to the English club Derby County, where he became a fan favourite; he made his Derby, and FA Premier League debut, on 9 August 1997 against Blackburn Rovers. His first goal for the Derbyshire club came on 30 August 1997 when he scored in a league game against Barnsley. In this season, Derby County moved from their former home at the Baseball Ground to their new home, Pride Park Stadium, and Eranio's goal, to take the score to 1–0 against Barnsley was the first that was scored at Derby's new home ground. Eranio had thought of retiring after the 2000–01 season, but manager Jim Smith persuaded him to stay on. When Smith resigned in October 2001, Eranio chose to leave Derby County. He retired in 2003 after spending a season with lowly fourth division Serie C2 side Pro Sesto, where he was featured in a player/assistant manager position.

He is widely considered to be one of the greatest and most influential players to play for Derby County and, on 1 May 2006, Eranio and Ted McMinn were inducted as Derby Legends.

International career
Eranio made his senior international debut for Italy on 22 December 1990, in a match against Cyprus; the game was a qualification match for the UEFA Euro 1992, and Italy won the game 4–0. His first international goal came in a friendly against the Netherlands on 9 September 1992; Italy won the game 3–2.

On 29 March 1997, Eranio played his last game for Italy, against Moldova in a 3–0 home win. In total, he received 20 caps, and scored three goals, with six of his international appearances coming in World Cup qualifiers, and the other five in European Championship qualifiers.

Post-playing career

Coaching
Eranio has been part of the A.C. Milan youth coaching staff since 2005, and is currently head of the Giovanissimi Nazionali (under-15) youth team.

Media
On 22 October 2015, Eranio was fired by Swiss television station RSI following racist remarks. Criticising an error made by Roma defender Antonio Rüdiger during the 4–4 draw in the Champions League against Bayer Leverkusen, Eranio had stated: "Black players in the defensive line often make these mistakes because they’re not concentrated. They are powerful physically, but when it is time to think … they often make this type of error."

Career statistics

Club

Honours
Milan
Serie A: 1992–93, 1993–94, 1995–96
Supercoppa Italiana: 1992, 1993, 1994
UEFA Champions League: 1993–94
UEFA Supercup: 1994

Genoa
Serie B: 1988–89

References

Sources
 Mortimer, Gerald (2004): The Who's Who of DERBY COUNTY.  Breedon Books Publishing, Derby.

External links
 
 Overview of Eranio's international career (RSSSF)

1966 births
Living people
Footballers from Genoa
Association football wingers
Italian footballers
Italy international footballers
Italian expatriate footballers
Derby County F.C. players
Genoa C.F.C. players
A.C. Milan players
S.S.D. Pro Sesto managers
S.S.D. Pro Sesto players
Premier League players
Serie A players
Serie B players
Expatriate footballers in England
Italian expatriate sportspeople in England
Italian football managers